Kopete is a multi-protocol, free software instant messaging client released as part of the KDE Software Compilation. Although it can run in numerous environments, it was designed for and integrates with the KDE Plasma Workspaces. Kopete was started because ICQ blocked Licq from their network in 2001. According to the original author, Duncan Mac-Vicar Prett, the name comes from the Chilean Spanish word copete, meaning "a drink with your friends". Kopete has been nominated for multiple awards. The designated successor is KDE Telepathy from the KDE RTCC Initiative.

Protocols 
Kopete allows users to connect to the following protocols:

MSNP (Microsoft Messenger service, commonly known as MSN, .NET, or Live) was also supported until the protocol was discontinued by Microsoft.

Features

Plugins 
By default, Kopete supports the following plugins (not all of which are currently functional):

With third-party plugins, Kopete supports:
 Off-the-Record Messaging enabling for encrypted conversations with deniable authentication and perfect forward secrecy.
 Antispam by asking a simple question to unknown contacts.
 OpenPGP cryptography is available from the Debian package kopete-cryptography.

See also 

 Comparison of instant messaging clients
 Comparison of instant messaging protocols
 Comparison of Internet Relay Chat clients
 Kadu
 Konversation

References

Notes

External links 

Old official website (archived)

2010 software
AIM (software) clients
Free instant messaging clients
Free Internet Relay Chat clients
Free XMPP clients
Instant messaging clients that use Qt
Internet Relay Chat clients
KDE Applications
Videoconferencing software that uses Qt
Voice over IP clients that use Qt
Yahoo! instant messaging clients